Foxburrow Wood is a   Local Nature Reserve in Rainham in Kent. It is owned and managed by Medway Council.

This is a remnant of a much larger historic wood, and it has flora which are indicators of ancient woodland such as herb paris and bluebells.

There is access from Mierscourt Road.

References

Local Nature Reserves in Kent